The Gippslander was an Australian named passenger train operated by the Victorian Railways from Melbourne through the Gippsland region to Bairnsdale. Operating along the Gippsland line daily except Sundays it had buffet car facilities provided.

The train was named in 1954 to celebrate the electrification of the main line as far Traralgon, but 66 years after the passenger service had commenced along the line. The train was originally hauled by an L class electric locomotive from Melbourne to Traralgon, where an R class steam locomotive took over for the journey to Sale, with the final leg to Bairnsdale hauled by a J class steam locomotive. Steam traction on the service was later replaced by T class diesel locomotives.

After the decommissioning of the overhead system in the 1980s a variety of diesel locomotives could be seen hauling the train. The Gippslander name continues in use today for V/Line intercity services along the line but no special facilities are provided.

References

External links
Electric hauled in 1981
Loco changeover in 1986
Diesel hauled in 1988

Railway services introduced in 1954
Named passenger trains of Victoria (Australia)
Discontinued railway services in Australia